Peter White (born October 10, 1937) is an American actor.

White was born in New York City, New York and studied acting at the prestigious Yale School of Drama. In 1968, White received critical acclaim for his role as Alan McCarthy in off-Broadway's The Boys in the Band. White, and the rest of the original cast, appeared in the 1970 film version, directed by William Friedkin. He played Director of Central Intelligence John A. McCone in the film Thirteen Days.

Among White's many television credits are appearances on The Feather and Father Gang, Ally McBeal, Hart to Hart, The West Wing, Dallas, The Colbys, a recurring co-starring role as Dr. Thomas Reed on the television series Sisters and playing the role of Lincoln 'Linc' Tyler off and on for over thirty years on the soap opera All My Children.

In 2010, White appeared in filmmaker Crayton Robey's making-of The Boys in the Band documentary Making the Boys.

References

External links

1937 births
Living people
American male film actors
American male television actors
Male actors from New York City